Xiamen Gaoqi International Airport  is the airport serving the city of Xiamen in Fujian Province, China. It is the main base of XiamenAir and TAECO, an aircraft maintenance provider. The airport is located on the north side of Xiamen Island. Construction of a new terminal (Terminal 4) started in October 2011 and was completed in 2014.

In 2012, Xiamen airport was the 8th busiest airport in China in terms of cargo traffic, and the 11th busiest in terms of passenger traffic with 17,354,076 passengers and the 10th busiest airport by traffic movements.

Development

New destinations
KLM began the first intercontinental air route out of Xiamen, to Amsterdam, on 27 March 2011. Since then, long-haul traffic has expanded, with XiamenAir launching flights to Sydney, Vancouver and Los Angeles after taking delivery of the Boeing 787.

New airport
Following the opening of Terminal 4 in 2014, Gaoqi airport had little room to expand. As such, a new airport is currently under construction on Dadeng Island, Xiang'an District, currently known as Xiamen Xiang'an International Airport. When completed it will have two new runways, a 550,000 sq meter terminal, and be able to handle up to 45 million passengers, and have subway links to Xiamen railway station.

Airlines and destinations

Passenger

Cargo

See also
List of airports in China
List of the busiest airports in China

References

External links
Official site

Airports in Fujian
Transport in Xiamen
Buildings and structures in Xiamen